(known in Europe as Football International) is a football video game with top-down perspective, developed by Tose for the Game Boy handheld, which was released in 1991.

Gameplay

The game consists of exhibition games (test match) and tournament games (world cup). In World Cup mode, one plays until one beats all other seven teams.

Eight national teams are represented in the game:

 
 
 
 
  (the United Kingdom flag is incorrectly displayed)

See also
Sports Collection

References

External links
Football International at MobyGames

1991 video games
Association football video games
Bandai games
Game Boy games
Game Boy-only games
Tokyo Shoseki games
Tonkin House games
Tose (company) games
Video games developed in Japan
Video games scored by Yoshiki Nishimura
Multiplayer and single-player video games